Héricourt may refer to:

 Héricourt, Pas-de-Calais, a commune of the Pas-de-Calais department in France
 Héricourt, Haute-Saône, a commune of the Haute-Saône department in France

See also
Héricourt-en-Caux, a commune of the Seine-Maritime department in France
Héricourt-sur-Thérain, a commune of the Oise department in France
Battle of Héricourt, 1474, part of the Burgundian Wars